Leucostegia is a genus of ferns in the family Hypodematiaceae in the Pteridophyte Phylogeny Group classification of 2016 (PPG I).

Species
, the Checklist of Ferns and Lycophytes of the World accepted the following species:
Leucostegia pallida (Mett. ex Kuhn) Copel.
Leucostegia truncata (D.Don) Fraser-Jenk.

References

Polypodiales
Fern genera